Orophora unicolor is a bagmoth of the Psychidae family, endemic to New Zealand. It was described by Arthur Gardiner Butler in 1877, and redescribed in ignorance by Richard William Fereday in the same year.

This species is restricted to dry areas of the South Island, where it feeds on tussock and cassinia. Its case is covered with layers of short (up to 10 mm) lengths of tussock, laid longitudinally and overlapping, so that it looks like a bundle of twigs. Fereday collected O. unicolor on matagouri (Discaria toumatou) but noted that these were all pupal cases and that fragments of matagouri were not incorporated into the cases. The case averages 34 mm long and can reach 40 mm.

Only the male metamorphoses into a recognisable moth. The adult female never leaves the bag and has no wings. The male is a hairy grey moth with translucent wings and a short abdomen and a 26.5 mm wingspan.

References

Moths described in 1877
Psychidae
Moths of New Zealand
Endemic fauna of New Zealand
Taxa named by Arthur Gardiner Butler
Endemic moths of New Zealand